Ghana women's national under-17 football team represents Ghana in international youth football competitions. It is one of the strongest in Africa and is the only African nation to have qualified to every youth World Cup so far.

FIFA U-17 Women's World Cup record

African U-17 Cup of Nations for Women
 2008 - Runners-up
 2010 - Champion 
 2012 - Champion 
 2013 - Champion 
 2016 - Champion 
 2018 - Champion 

 : with Nigeria
 : with Gambia & Nigeria
 : with Nigeria & Zambia
 : with Nigeria & Cameroon
 : with Cameroon & South Africa

Current squad

Squad for the 2016 FIFA U-17 Women's World Cup.

Previous squads
2008 FIFA U-17 Women's World Cup
2010 FIFA U-17 Women's World Cup
2012 FIFA U-17 Women's World Cup
2014 FIFA U-17 Women's World Cup
2016 FIFA U-17 Women's World Cup

See also
 Ghana women's national football team
 Ghana women's national under-20 football team

References

External links 
 Team profile - soccerway.com

under
Women's national under-17 association football teams